Smosh: The Movie is a 2015 American science fiction buddy comedy web film directed by Alex Winter and written by Eric Falconer and Steve Marmel, with Brian Robbins and Shauna Phelan serving as producers. It stars Anthony Padilla and Ian Hecox from Smosh, Jillian Nelson, Brittany Ross, Jenna Marbles, Grace Helbig, Mark Fischbach, Harley Morenstein, and Michael Ian Black. It is Smosh's first full-length film and revolves around a fictionalized version of the duo going inside YouTube virtually to alter a clip that will ruin Anthony's chances of winning over his high school crush at the reunion.

The film premiered in Los Angeles at Vidcon on July 23, 2015 and was released the following day on VOD on July 24, 2015 by Twentieth Century Fox Home Entertainment, to generally negative reviews.

Plot
Anthony Padilla and Ian Hecox are best friends and live in a small house, with Ian's parents. Anthony has a dead-end job as a pizza delivery man and Ian is a stay at home YouTube stalking man child and prankster. After returning from the Game Bang game center, in which they were bullied by some street kids due to Anthony's pizza car, they find a video of Anthony reciting the Magic Pocket Slave Monsters theme at their high school graduation. In the video, Anthony attempts to impress his crush, Anna Reed, by trying to do a backflip, but he fails, landing on his face, and resulting in the microphone subtly going in his anus. After learning their 5th-year high school reunion is on the same day, the duo decides to pull down the video before it blows Anthony's chances of reconnecting with Anna.

They travel to the YouTube headquarters, where they meet a receptionist named Stephanie, who introduces them to the President of the company, Steve YouTube. Steve explains that the only way to fix the video is by going inside YouTube through a portal and changing the video from the inside. Anthony insists that it is important enough to go through with it, so Ian accompanies him in traveling into YouTube. Steve provides the duo with two electronic phones equipped with an artificial intelligence named Diri and sends them through the portal that is behind his closet door. After tumbling through a series of YouTube videos, they eventually end up in a Jenna Marbles vlog. Jenna warns them that once their Diri phones run out of battery, they will be permanently stuck in YouTube, just like her; they find out there are two Jennas.

They decide to split up, but Ian immediately abandons the mission and travels to his YouTube crush video, "Butt Massage Girl", while Anthony escapes a furry party, gets advice from Steve Austin, and finds out that Anna really likes him too. Diri takes Anthony to the Butt Massage Girl video that Ian is getting a massage in. Anthony tells Ian that his and Butt Massage Girl's love is fake and that it's only a video.

The duo then make it to the embarrassing video, where a furious Anthony discovers that Ian was the one who recorded and uploaded the video. Ian finally expresses his frustration with how boring Anthony has become, which leads to an argument between the pair. They both engage in a fight that lasts through three other videos, ending with them returning to Anthony’s video. Ian decides to make it up to Anthony by beating up his past self, preventing his humiliation. Anthony then goes to help him, but past Ian interferes and attacks Anthony, while Ian is trying to knock out past Anthony. In the process, the other students also start to fight one another. During the battle, Diri reveals itself to be Steve YouTube, who tells them that sending the two into YouTube was part of his evil scheme to keep them in YouTube forever.

Frightened, they race to escape YouTube via their video history, with Steve putting several unsuccessful obstacles in their way, as they make it to the portal only for Steve YouTube to be there waiting for them. Suddenly, a bear appears and attacks Steve, allowing the duo to escape YouTube. Returning to the real world, Anthony and Ian discover that, due to their changes to Anthony's embarrassing video (and therefore literal history), they have become famous, turning the video into the "Clone Fight" video; in which they met the President of the United States, created a movie, a TV series, and a show on Broadway. Through this, Ian is dating Butt Massage Girl, Anthony has 30 girlfriends, whom he immediately rejects and the duo are now living in a mansion in which Ian's parents live with them. Steve YouTube, now going by You-too-bay, has Anthony's former job as a pizza delivery man and Jenna Marbles is the CEO of YouTube. Butt Massage Girl accompanies them as they go to their high school reunion.

As they arrive at their reunion, they discover they are the most famous ones there. When Anthony seeks out Anna and finds her, he is dismayed to find out that Anna loved him back in the day, but she was intimidated by him being rich and famous. Encouraged by Ian and an image of Austin, Anthony performs 'Magic Pocket Slave Monsters', and successfully performs the backflip, alongside Ian and finally wins Anna over, and they kiss. Butt Massage Girl and Anna meet onstage to which Butt Massage Girl reveals her name is Brad, to which Ian exclaims explosively.

In a post-credits scene, Ian marries Brad with Anthony crying in the background.

Cast 

 Anthony Padilla as Anthony
 Ian Hecox as Ian
 Jillian Nelson as Anna Reed
 Brittany Ross as Brad/Butt Massage Girl
 Michael Ian Black as Steve YouTube
 Stone Cold Steve Austin as himself
 Jenna Marbles as a fictionalized version of herself
 Harley Morenstein as The Mailman
 Grace Helbig as Stephanie
 Mark Fischbach as a fictionalized version of himself
 Kimmy Gatewood as the voice of Diri
 Damion Poitier as Super Boring Man
 Dominic Sandoval as Nearby Student 
 Elisha Yaffe as High Driver
 Mari Takahashi as herself (cameo appearance)
 Matthew Sohinki as himself (cameo appearance)
 Joshua "Jovenshire" Ovenshire as himself (cameo appearance)
 David "Lasercorn" Moss as himself (cameo appearance)
 Amra “Flitz” Ricketts as himself (cameo appearance)
 Alex Winter as Anna's Uncle (pictured and uncredited)

Production

On September 18, 2014, Lionsgate announced that it has picked up the international distribution rights to the movie, while 20th Century Fox picked up American VOD and physical distribution rights to the movie. Production for the film was jointly financed by AwesomenessFilms, Smosh Productions, and Defy Media. The film was written from an original story by Eric Falconer and Steve Marmel, while being produced by Brian Robbins, with Padilla and Hecox serving as executive producers. Alex Winter was hired as the director for the film. It was entirely shot in YouTube Space in Los Angeles, California. In May 2020, Ian Hecox revealed on the podcast Cold Ones that the movie originally got an R rating from the MPAA.

Release
On April 15, 2015, it was announced that the film would release on July 24, 2015, and would be having its gala world premiere at Vidcon 2015 in Anaheim, California a day before. An official trailer was released on Smosh's website on June 12, 2015. They also hosted a commentary live-stream on their YouTube channel at July 21, 2015.

Home media
Smosh: The Movie was released on DVD on August 18, 2015 by Twentieth Century Fox Home Entertainment, featuring an Unrated version with some deleted scenes, including a scene featuring Shane Dawson as the Sex Simulator Guy. Shortly thereafter, Netflix acquired the worldwide streaming rights to the film courtesy of AwesomenessFilms in 2015, and was released in August 2019.

Reception

Critical reception 

The film received generally negative reviews, criticizing the directing, writing, acting, and humor, but fair praise was given to Padilla and Hecox's comedic chemistry. It has also been the subject of mockery to YouTube film commentators, comparing it to similar films like the FRED trilogy, Not Cool, and Airplane Mode, all of which are web comedy films that are of lowbrow humor created by and featured high-profile YouTube celebrities. 

The New York Times gave it a negative review, describing the film as "a fairly successful effort to apply the tone and comic style of those hastily produced weekly shorts to a feature-length script with an actual plot." The review went on to note that it was "clever and surprisingly easy to sit through". The review concluded that "Is it worth your $9.99? Maybe not, but if you can buy it on your parents' credit card, you'll probably enjoy it." Common Sense Media gave it a 2 out of 5, stating that although they are a "popular YouTube sensation, they have a Millennial Dumb and Dumber/slacker shtick that's funny for a second and then quickly grows tedious." The review also criticized the acting and was summarized that "if Hollywood was looking for a movie that truly elevates web celebs to the status of pulling off a feature-length film, this isn't it."

References

External links 
 
 
 
 Smosh: The Movie at Rotten Tomatoes

2015 films
Lionsgate films
2015 comedy films
2010s buddy comedy films
2010s science fiction comedy films
2015 science fiction action films
2010s science fiction adventure films
2010s action adventure films
American films with live action and animation
American comedy films
American independent films
American buddy comedy films
American teen comedy films
American science fiction comedy films
American action comedy films
American science fiction films
Awesomeness Films films
20th Century Fox films
Films set in California
Films shot in California
Films directed by Alex Winter
Films about the Internet
Films about social media
Films based on web series
Films set in 2014
2010s English-language films
2010s American films